SZ Tauri is a variable star in the equatorial constellation of Taurus. The brightness of this star varies from an apparent visual magnitude of 6.39 down to 6.69 with a period of 3.149 days, which is near the lower limit of visibility to the naked eye. The distance to this star is approximately 2,070 light years based on parallax measurements. There is some indication this may be a binary system, but the evidence is inconclusive.

A 1916 spectral study by H. Shapley showed that the class of this pulsating Cepheid variable changed along the light curve, ranging from F7 at minimum up to A9 at peak luminosity. Y. N. Efremov suggested in 1964 that this star may be a halo member of the NGC 1647 open cluster, located 2.2° to the northeast. However, this was later disputed based on a poor proper motion match. It was confirmed to be a classical Cepheid by W. P. Gieren in 1985.

In the General Catalogue of Variable Stars, SZ Tau is classified as a Delta Cepheid of type DCEPS, which shows a nearly symmetric light curve with a small amplitude. It is pulsating in the first overtone and in evolutionary terms is undergoing its second crossing of the Cepheid instability strip. By 1987, four changes in the pulsation period of SZ Tau had been observed; the pulsation rate is decreasing by −0.49 s/yr. The star is about 75 million years old with six times the mass of the Sun and 42 times the Sun's radius. The effective temperature, radius, and spectral type of the star vary across each pulsation cycle.

References 

F-type supergiants
Classical Cepheid variables

Taurus (constellation)
BD+18 661
029260
021517
Tauri, SZ